The Jinnah's People's Memorial Hall, is located inside the compound of the Indian National Congress building near Lamington Road, in Mumbai, India.

See also
 Jinnah House

External links
 State ownership does not guarantee a public monument - The Times of India
 Jinnah in the eye of Advani 

Buildings and structures in Mumbai
History of Mumbai
Tourist attractions in Mumbai
Memorials to Muhammad Ali Jinnah